The Uruguay men's national 3x3 team is a national basketball team of Uruguay, administered by the Federación Uruguaya de Básquetbol - "FUBB".

It represents the country in international 3x3 (3 against 3) basketball competitions.

See also
Uruguay women's national 3x3 team
Uruguay men's national basketball team

References

3x3
Men's national 3x3 basketball teams